Goniobranchus rubrocornutus is a species of colourful sea slug, a dorid nudibranch, a marine gastropod mollusc in the family Chromodorididae.

Distribution
This marine species occurs in the Western Pacific. It was described from Hong Kong. It has been reported from American Samoa, the Marshall Islands and the Philippines.

Description
Goniobranchus rubrocornutus is a chromodorid nudibranch with a semi-translucent white mantle and coloured margin. In this species there is an irregular white band, then a broken red marginal band and a broad yellow band at the edge of the mantle. The rhinophores and gills are translucent red. The body reaches a length of 15 mm.

References

Chromodorididae
Gastropods described in 1985